The 2022–23 Gonzaga Bulldogs women's basketball team represents Gonzaga University in the 2022–23 NCAA Division I women's basketball season. The Bulldogs (also informally referred to as the "Zags"), are members of the West Coast Conference. The Bulldogs, led by ninth year head coach Lisa Fortier, play their home games at the McCarthey Athletic Center on the university campus in Spokane, Washington.

Previous season 

The Bulldogs finished the season at 27–7 and 15–2 in WCC play to finish in second place. They won WCC women's tournament by defeating BYU. They received an automatic bid to the NCAA Women's Tournament as a 9th seed in Wichita region where they defeated Nebraska in the first round before losing to Louisville in second round.

Offseason

Departures
Due to COVID-19 disruptions throughout NCAA sports in 2020–21, the NCAA announced that the 2020–21 season would not count against the athletic eligibility of any individual involved in an NCAA winter sport, including women's basketball. This meant that all seniors in 2020–21 had the option to return for 2021–22.

Incoming transfers

Recruiting
There were no recruiting classing class of 2022.

Roster

Schedule

|-
!colspan=9 style=| Exhibition

|-
!colspan=9 style=| Regular season

|-
!colspan=9 style=|WCC Women's Tournament

|-
!colspan=9 style=| NCAA tournament

Rankings

*The preseason and week 1 polls were the same.^Coaches did not release a week 2 poll.

^Coaches did not release a Week 2 poll.

See also
2022–23 Gonzaga Bulldogs men's basketball team

References

Gonzaga
Gonzaga Bulldogs women's basketball seasons
Gonzaga
Gonzaga
Gonzaga